Vic Hutchens (31 August 1876 – 8 November 1964) was an Australian rules footballer who played with Essendon in the Victorian Football League (VFL).

Notes

External links 

1876 births
1964 deaths
Australian rules footballers from Victoria (Australia)
Essendon Football Club players